Cerrophidion godmani is a venomous pit viper species found in southern Mexico and Guatemala. No subspecies are currently recognized. It is also known as the Godman's montane pit viper or the Godman's pit viper.

Etymology
The specific name, godmani, is in honor of English zoologist Frederick DuCane Godman.

Description

Geographic range
Cerrophidion godmani is found in Mexico in the Mexican states of Chiapas and southeastern Oaxaca and in Guatemala. Populations from south of Guatemala are now assigned to a new species, Cerrophidion sasai . The type locality given is "near Dueñas and on the other parts of the tableland of Guatemala".

References

Further reading
Günther A (1863). "Third Account of new Species of Snakes in the Collection of the British Museum". Ann. Mag. Nat. Hist., Third Series 12: 348-365. ("Bothriechis Godmanni", new species, pp. 364-365 + Plate VI, Figure G).

Crotalinae
Snakes of Central America
Reptiles of Mexico
Reptiles of Guatemala
Taxa named by Albert Günther
Reptiles described in 1863